Chukhain Zaam is a small village in the Sulaiman Mountains. It is situated in Punjab province of Pakistan. The village almost near to the border of Balochistan and Khyber Pakhtunkhwa provinces. The majority of people living there belong to Qaisrani tribe which is also known as the Baloch Tribal Area of Dera Ghazi Khan.

Schools
There are two Government Primary Schools in this village; one for boys and other for girls. The Boy's Primary School Chukhain Zaam, was established in 1961 by the efforts of Wadera Jumma Khan Qaisrani(1930 - 9 January 2008) of this village. The first teacher of this school was Amir Muhammad Qaisrani who was only Middle pass. This Primary School Chukhain Zaam has the distinction of producing many learned personalities.

Language
The language spoken in this village is Balochi. Being on the border line of Balochistan province, most of the men also understand Pashto language.

Flora and fauna
The trees on the sides of houses and fields are mostly Khaur, Khunar, Pheer and Gaz. The grass of the hills is Gorkha and Khikh. The animals near the village are rabbits, wolf, jackals, fox, porcupine, hedgehog, wild dogs, cats, snakes, mice, squirrels, baghars (wild lizards). The  common birds are: saysee (partridges), pigeons, Tuttin, dove, khohlang, sparrows, falcon, phiddi, kakoohi,  tilhar, bats, owls, drakhan murgs, tateehar, quail, hilly black crows and others.

References

Populated places in Balochistan, Pakistan